Tommy Maxwell (born November 19, 1985) is an American ice hockey right winger. He currently plays for the Rapid City Rush of the ECHL.

Career 
In the 2011–12 season, Maxwell signed a one-year contract with the St. John's IceCaps on October 26, 2011. He was then reassigned and split the year between the IceCaps and ECHL affiliate the Colorado Eagles. On September 12, 2012, Maxwell signed with ECHL rival the Utah Grizzlies for a one-year deal.

Career statistics

References

External links

1985 births
American men's ice hockey right wingers
Colorado Eagles players
Hershey Bears players
Ice hockey people from Washington (state)
Living people
Manitoba Moose players
Medicine Hat Tigers players
Phoenix RoadRunners players
South Carolina Stingrays players
Sportspeople from Spokane, Washington
St. John's IceCaps players
Utah Grizzlies (ECHL) players
Victoria Salmon Kings players